Black storms, locally called Kali Andhi , Kali Nheri in South Asia (literal meaning: Black Storm) are violent dust squalls that occur in the late-spring in the northwestern parts of the Indo-Gangetic Plain region of the Indian Subcontinent.

They are usually brief, but they can block out the sun, drastically reduce visibility and cause property damage and injuries. They are a common precursor to the arrival of the monsoon in the northern plains. It is quite common in Punjab in the Cholistan and Thar deserts in Pakistan and Rajasthan in India.

References

Winds
Climate of India
Climate of Pakistan